Air Vice Marshal Brian Courtenay Yarde,  (5 September 1905 – 29 October 1986) was a Royal Air Force officer during the Second World War and a senior commander in the 1950s.

Early life and career
Born on 5 September 1905, Brian Yarde was educated at Bedford School and at the Royal Air Force College Cranwell, where he received the Sword of Honour in 1926. During the Second World War he served in France, Malaya, and in the Middle East. In 1945, he was appointed as deputy director of Bomber Operations at the Air Ministry. Between 1947 and 1949 he was Station Commander of RAF Gatow during the Berlin Airlift, and between 1951 and 1953 he was Provost Marshal and Chief of the Royal Air Force Police. Between 1953 and 1954 he was Air Officer Commanding No. 62 Group, and between 1954 and 1957 he was Commandant-General of the RAF Regiment.

Air Vice Marshal Yarde retired from the Royal Air Force in 1957. He died on 29 October 1986.

References

1905 births
1986 deaths
People educated at Bedford School
Graduates of the Royal Air Force College Cranwell
British World War II pilots
Royal Air Force air marshals
Royal Air Force Regiment officers
Commanders of the Royal Victorian Order
Commanders of the Order of the British Empire